Aubin is a masculine French given name variant of Albin, from the Roman cognate Albinus, derived from the Latin albus, meaning "white" or "bright". It is also common as a surname. People with the name Aubin include:

Saint
 Albinus of Angers, aka Saint Aubin of Angers, French saint

Given name
 Aubin-Edmond Arsenault (1870–1968), Premier of Prince Edward Island, Canada
 Joseph Aubin Doiron (1922–1995), Canadian, Arcadian politician

Surname
 Albert Zenophile Aubin (1891–1957), Canadian politician
 Azaire Adulphe Aubin (1850–?), Canadian politician
 Charlotte Aubin (born 1991), Canadian actress
 Christian Aubin (1927–2007), French guitarist and luthier 
 Jean-Sébastien Aubin (1977–), Canadian ice hockey player
  (1802 – 1891), French collector 
 Napoléon Aubin (1812–1890), Canadian journalist
 Penelope Aubin (c. 1679–c. 1731), English novelist and translator
 Serge Aubin (1975–), Canadian professional ice hockey centre 
 Thierry Aubin (1942–2009), French mathematician
 Tony Aubin (1907–1981), French composer

See also
 Saint-Aubin (disambiguation)

References

French masculine given names
French-language surnames